Unín may refer to places:

Unín (Brno-Country District), a municipality and village in the Czech Republic
Unín, Skalica District, a municipality and village in Slovakia

See also
Unin (disambiguation)